Speed Farm is a historic farm complex and national historic district located near Gupton, Franklin County, North Carolina.   The district encompasses 14 contributing buildings, 2 contributing sites, and 5 contributing structures. The farmhouse was built about 1847 and remodelled to its current configuration in 1900.  It is a two-story, three bay, I-house style frame dwelling.  It has a gable roof and an almost full-width front porch.  Also on the property are the contributing milk house (c. 1847), smokehouse (c. 1847), kitchen (c. 1847), family cemetery, and an agricultural complex with a granary, ram tower (c. 1935), barn (c. 1840, 1850), corn cribs, hog shed, tobacco grading building (c. 1930), five tobacco barns (c. 1940), and a tenant house (c. 1935).

It was listed on the National Register of Historic Places in 1991.

References

Farms on the National Register of Historic Places in North Carolina
Historic districts on the National Register of Historic Places in North Carolina
Houses completed in 1847
Buildings and structures in Franklin County, North Carolina
National Register of Historic Places in Franklin County, North Carolina
Houses in Franklin County, North Carolina
1847 establishments in North Carolina